Soldiers of Salamina is a 2003 Spanish drama film written, directed and edited by David Trueba, based on the novel Soldiers of Salamis by Javier Cercas. It stars Ariadna Gil and Ramón Fontserè alongside Joan Dalmau, María Botto and Diego Luna. The film was nominated for eight Goya Awards in 2004, and won the award for Best Cinematography.

Plot
Lola, a novelist who has abandoned her writing career, tracks down the details of a true story from the last days of the Spanish Civil War. The writer and Falangist honcho Rafael Sánchez Mazas faced a firing squad along with fifty other prisoners, but managed to escape into the woods. A Republican soldier, apparently one of those searching the area for the escaped prisoner, found him but allowed him to escape. The novelist pieces together the fragments of the story, plagued by contradictions and mysterious characters, and comes to realize that her search for the truth is a personal quest of self-discovery.

Cast

Production 
An adaptation of the 2001 novel Soldiers of Salamis by Javier Cercas, the screenplay was penned by Trueba. In the transfer from novel to film, the character of Javier Cercas becomes Lola Cercas (changing the gender of the lead character) and Chilean writer Roberto Bolaño is replaced by Gastón Elquiza, a Mexican university student with a family background of exiles of the Spanish civil war. The film is a Lolafilms and Fernando Trueba PC production. Shooting locations included Girona, Catalonia.

Release 
Distributed by Lolafilms, the film was theatrically released in Spain on 21 March 2003. It was also screened in the Un Certain Regard section at the 56th Cannes Film Festival in May 2003.

Accolades 

|-
| align = "center" rowspan = "10" | 2004 || rowspan = "8" | 18th Goya Awards || colspan = "2" | Best Film ||  || rowspan = "8" | 
|-
| Best Director || David Trueba || 
|-
| Best Adapted Screenplay || David Trueba || 
|-
| Best Actress || Ariadna Gil || 
|-
| Best Supporting Actress || María Botto || 
|-
| Best Supporting Actor || Joan Dalmau || 
|-
| Best Cinematography || Javier Aguirresarobe || 
|-
| Best Special Effects || Pedro Moreno, Alfonso Nieto, Emilio Ruiz del Río || 
|-
| rowspan = "2" | 13th Actors and Actresses Union Awards || Best Film Actress in a Secondary Role || María Botto ||  || rowspan = "2" | 
|-
| Best Film Actor in a Secondary Role || Joan Dalmau || 
|}

See also 
 List of Spanish films of 2003

References

External links

2003 films
Spanish drama films
2000s Spanish-language films
Spanish Civil War films
2000s Catalan-language films
Films based on Spanish novels
Films shot in Madrid
2003 drama films
Films directed by David Trueba
LolaFilms films
Films shot in the province of Girona
Films set in 1939
2000s Spanish films